Zagon is a village northwest of Postojna in the Inner Carniola region of Slovenia.

The local church in the settlement is dedicated to Saint Notburga and belongs to the Parish of Postojna.

References

External links
Zagon on Geopedia

Populated places in the Municipality of Postojna